Hungama 2 is a 2021 Indian Hindi-language romantic comedy film directed by Priyadarshan and jointly produced by Ratan Jain, Ganesh Jain, Chetan Jain and Armaan Ventures. It is the spiritual sequel of Priyadarshan's own 2003 film Hungama. It is loosely based on Priyadarshan's own 1994 Malayalam film Minnaram with a comedy sequence borrowed from his other Malayalam film Vandanam (1989) both starring Mohanlal. The film stars Paresh Rawal, Shilpa Shetty, Meezaan Jafri and Pranitha Subhash. 

The film marks the comebacks of both Priyadarshan and Shilpa Shetty to Hindi cinema after eight years and fourteen years respectively.

Hungama 2 premiered on 23 July 2021 on Disney+ Hotstar. The film received negative reviews from critics who criticized its writing, direction and performances although Rajpal's performance was well received.

Plot 
Retired Jailor Govind Kapoor's family includes his son Akash and Aman, his elder brother. He also has four mischievous grandchildren. The twist in the story happens when Vani, Akash's college girlfriend comes to their home with a child named Gehna and claims the child's father is Akash. Akash refute her claim. Akash is betrothed to Bajaj's daughter, who is a friend of Jailor Govind.

Akash takes the help of Anjali Tiwari, his co-worker to help him to hide things about vani and the child to not let anyone know about it. But Anjali's husband Radhe Shyam Tiwari, a lawyer, is a suspicious minded man. He thinks that her wife is having an affair with some other man and finds clue leading to Akash. Tiwari wrongly assume that Akash is lover of his wife, and his wife is pregnant with Akash child.

In flashback, it is shown that Vani and Akash loved each other and the former left the latter suddenly without notice. They perform a DNA test, but due to their inability to read the medical lingo & result, they couldn't reach any conclusion. Akash, now desperate tries to get his nieces and nephews to prank Vani so she will leave. One of their pranks ends up injuring Gehna. Vani take the blame to save the children from punishment and in her act win own the children, and Vani becomes their nanny and friend.

Akash engagement ceremony to Bajaj daughter is arrive and he tries to get Vani away from the ceremony without knowing that Bajaj invited her, assuming she was the new teacher of the grandchildren. Akash decide to change his bridal clothing mid-way to not arose vani suspicion, unbehenest to him Vani arrived at Engagement ceremony before him. Anjali meet Akash mid-way and changes inside her car. Tiwari sees him taking off his clothes (not knowing Akash was changing) and sees the car shaking assuming that his wife is having sex with Akash. Akash and Anjali come to the engagement ceremony but Anjali spot Vani. Vani is taken back home by Kapoor Chef on fabricated account that Gehna was injured to the relief of Kapoor family. Akash quickly get engaged.

Tiwari confront Anjali and Akash without stating he knows about their "Apparent Affair" but Akash and Anjali assume he knows about Vani, so they shrug it off. Appalled by their behavior, he tries to kill Akash, but end up himself in hospital on first attempt. Akash hire his and Vaani's old cafeteria manager (who is an excellent forger) to act as her husband, the same day Tiwari make his second attempt to murder Akash. The cafeteria manager comes in, but when asked he can't mention the child's name. Tiwari attempt to kill Akash botchup Cafeteria manager plan, destroying forged documents. A stranger meet Vani secretly and tell her to be present on the day of their own 'wedding'.

On Akash wedding reception, Tiwari get drunk and blurt out about his wife "Apparent affair" with Akash. In the confusion, truth about Vani and Gehna presence is revealed. The bride family call off the wedding. Akash gets drunk and try to force himself on Vani to tell the truth. To prevent this, Vani tells the truth and also tells that Gehna is neither hers nor Akash's but is her deceased sister and Akash's elder brother Aman's child. Vani later leaves the house with Gehna. Akash and family later decide that Vani and Akash should get married to each other. They goes out to find Vani. They arrived too late to find Vani getting married. The dejected Aakash confronts her, She hands over Gehna to Aman. The Stranger interrupt Kapoor's and introduce himself as multi-talented Auteur, Director, Producer et el. The marriage ceremony is revealed to be part of a TV series, and director request Kapoor family to not disrupt his TV Series production, as Vani has given him enough trouble by her absence during shooting and he is on deadline. Everyone later reconcile and Akash and Vani get married.

Cast 
 Paresh Rawal as Radhe Shyam Tiwari
 Shilpa Shetty as Anjali "Anju" Tiwari
 Meezaan Jafri as Aakash "Akku" Kapoor
 Pranitha Subhash as Vaani Kapoor
 Rajpal Yadav as Popat Jamal / Raja Dhatingarh Dhingra
 Tiku Talsania as Cook Ojasram Nandan
 Ashutosh Rana as Colonel Govind Kapoor aka Junglee Bail, Aakash's father
 Manoj Joshi as Manasvit G. Bajaj, Govind's partner
 Johnny Lever as Tutor Gagan Chandra D'Costa (cameo appearance)
 Akshaye Khanna as Premnath Pannu (cameo appearance)
 Siddhant Ghegadmal as Jayesh
 Raman Trikha as Aman Kapoor, Aakash's brother
 Menka Rai as Chinki
 Atharv Johnny as Parul
 Hardika Sharma as Vidhi
 Naira Shah as Priti
 Nandhu as Doctor (cameo appearance)

Production 
The film marks Priyadarshan's return to Bollywood after an eight-year hiatus since Rangrezz (2013). It is not a sequel to Hungama (2003), with Priyadarshan saying, "We decided to title the new comedy Hungama 2 because the mood of masti, mischief and hungama remain unchanged." It also marks the comeback of Shilpa Shetty for the first time in 14 years since Apne.

The principal photography commenced on 8 January 2020 in Mumbai. The film was initially scheduled for a theatrical release in India on 14 August 2020. However, production was halted due to the COVID-19 pandemic in India. Priyadarshan has indicated the filming is scheduled to resume in mid-September 2020. The film was wrapped up on 1 February 2021.

Music 
The music of film was composed by Anu Malik while lyrics written by Sameer Anjaan and Rani Malik (noted).
 
The first song Chura Ke Dil Mera 2.0 is a remake of the song of the same name from the 1994 film Main Khiladi Tu Anari.

Release
Hungama 2 premiered on 23 July 2021 on Disney+ Hotstar.

Reception 
Saibal Chatterjee of NDTV gave the film 1 star and stated, "Priyadarshan was once feted for the controlled lunacy of his comedies. Here, the lunacy is intact. Control is conspicuous by its absence." Shubhra Gupta of The Indian Express gave the film 1.5 out of 5 stars and stated, "Only a few people keep you from fleeing this loud and obvious fare – a svelte Shilpa Shetty, Ashutosh Rana playing a curmudgeon, and Priyadarshan staple Paresh Rawal." Samrudhi Ghosh of Hindustan Times gave the film a negative review and stated, "Priyadarshan's chaotic comedy-of-errors is distressingly dated." Narendra Saini of NDTV India gave the film 2 out of 5 stars and stated, "[Priyadarshan] has a style of comedy, in which there is a lot of confusion and it is accompanied by a long army of stars. That's how he tries to laugh. But this time he misses out completely and tries to make the audience laugh through the old formula." Sudhanshu Maheshwari of Aaj Tak gave the film 2 out of 5 stars and stated, "In such a situation, there was some buzz about Hungama 2, but in the absence of comedy, it remained just a noisy film, which would not harm anyone in."

References

External links 

 

2020s Hindi-language films
2021 romantic comedy films
Indian sequel films
Hindi remakes of Malayalam films
Indian romantic comedy films
Films directed by Priyadarshan